Budersberg is a small town in the commune of Dudelange, in southern Luxembourg.  As of 2005, the town has a population of 350. 

Quarters of Dudelange
Towns in Luxembourg